The Sulawesi blue flycatcher (Cyornis omissus) is a species of bird in the family Muscicapidae.  It is endemic to Indonesia.  Its natural habitats are subtropical or tropical moist lowland forests and subtropical or tropical moist montane forests.

Four subspecies are recognised:

 C. o. omissus (Hartert, EJO, 1896) – montane Sulawesi
 C. o. omississimus Rheindt, Prawiradilaga, Ashari & Suparno & Gwee, 2020 – Togian Islands (between northeast and central east Sulawesi)
 C. o. peromissus Hartert, EJO, 1920 – Salayar (south of Sulawesi)
 C. o. djampeanus (Hartert, EJO, 1896) – Tanahjampea (south of Sulawesi)

The subspecies C. o. djampeanus is sometimes recognised as a separate species, the Tanahjampea blue flycatcher.

References

Sulawesi blue flycatcher
Endemic birds of Sulawesi
Sulawesi blue flycatcher
Taxonomy articles created by Polbot